Nothin' but love was Japanese pop unit under the Giza Studio label.

History
In June 1999 Yoshinobu has created demo tape and during music production he met in studio with Yuuya. In June 2000, the band formation began.

In May 2001, they've released major debut single Callin' you, as B-side track includes cover song My Ever Changing Moods by The Style Council. On 30 June 2001 they've participated in Kansai Walker Matsuri 2001 Summer's event live where the band has covered Cyndi Lauper's Time After Time and Earth, Wind & Fire 's Fantasy. In November 2001, they released second and final single Tameiki ha Shiroku, Kimi wa Tooku. Promotional music video was in media it was used as an ending theme for Tokyo Broadcasting System Television program Rank Oukoku.

None of their singles didn't reach to Oricon rankings successfully and their sales were low. In December 2001, Callin' you was included in Giza Studio's compilation album Giza Studio Masterpiece Blend 2001. In 2002 there weren't modified activities, the disband happened without announcement and soon deleted from the list of official Giza Studio artists.

After disbanding, Yoshinobu formed own Japanese rock band OOM with keyboardist U-zo Ohkusu where they were active between years 2004–2009 and since 2012 both of them are members of instrumental band Sensation. Yuuya presence was unknown until 2016 where fans spot him using real name Ohmochi Hideyasu (大持秀康) with indies band mo.chy/z as vocalist and guitarist. On his YouTube channel he uploaded several covers videos with self-made arrangement.

Musical style

Influence
On their profile from official website, they listed 3 artist where took inspiration from during producing music: The Style Council, Culture Club, Duran Duran.

Members
  – vocals, lyricist
  – guitar, composer, arranger

Discography

Singles

Compilation album

Magazine appearances
From Music Freak Magazine:
Vol.78 2002/5 (Callin' you interview)
Vol.84 2002/11 (Tameiki wa Shiroku, Kimi wa Tooku interview)
Vol.86 2002/1 (New Year Card message)

References

External links
Official Web site 	
Official Website with Giza name 	
 	

Being Inc. artists
Japanese pop music groups
Musical groups established in 2000
Musical groups disestablished in 2002
2000 establishments in Japan
Musical groups from Osaka